Zhou Heng may refer to:
 Zhou Heng (footballer)
 Zhou Heng (physicist)